This is a list of awards and nominations given to the animated television series South Park.

Primetime Emmy Awards

Annie Awards

Behind the Voice Actors Awards

Critics' Choice Television Awards

Gold Derby Awards

Online Film & Television Association Awards

Peabody Awards

People's Choice Awards

Satellite Awards

Teen Choice Awards

Television Critics Association Award

References

External links
 

South Park
Awards